The Dean Road Bridge on the Vermillion River is a historic Pratt truss bridge built in 1898.  It was listed on the National Register of Historic Places in 1978.

It spans the Vermillion River between Erie and Lorain counties.

It was built by the Massillon Bridge Co. and was deemed to be "an excellent example of the turn-of-the-century metal truss bridges that were constructed throughout this region."

References

Pratt truss bridges
Bridges on the National Register of Historic Places in Ohio
National Register of Historic Places in Erie County, Ohio
National Register of Historic Places in Lorain County, Ohio
Transport infrastructure completed in 1898